Mbilwi Secondary School is a school in the town of Sibasa in Limpopo, South Africa.

Mbilwi Secondary School has been producing 100% pass rate for its matric students since 1994. The school also produces over 90% of matric exemptions since 1997.. it is known for being a maths & science school. it has produced known people like the vice chancellor of university of johanessburg.

It is a public school that started in 1978. When it started it did not have a proper science laboratory until 2003.

Notable alumni
Phophi Ramathuba (born 1973), political leader in the Department of Health at the Limpopo Province
Mashudu Tshifularo (born 1964), educator and medical specialist
Mulalo Doyoyo (born 1970), engineer, polymathic inventor, and professor
Tshilidzi Marwala (born 1971), mechanical engineer and computer scientist
Azwinndini Muronga, Dean of Science at the Nelson Mandela Metropolitan University
Fulufhelo Nelwamondo (born 1982), electrical engineer and research scientist
Khumbudzo Ntshavheni (born 1977), Minister of Small Business Development in the Republic of South Africa

References

External links
 Mbilwi Secondary School's web site

Schools in Limpopo
Educational institutions established in 1978
1978 establishments in South Africa